The Isachsen Formation is a geologic formation in Nunavut. It preserves fossils of Polycotylidae indet., dating back to the Aptian stage of the Cretaceous period.

See also 
 List of fossiliferous stratigraphic units in Nunavut

References

Further reading 
 M. J. Vavrek, B. C. Wilhelm, E. E. Maxwell and H. C. E. Larsson. 2014. Arctic plesiosaurs from the Lower Cretaceous of Melville Island, Nunavut, Canada. Cretaceous Research 50:273-281

External links 
 

Geologic formations of Canada
Cretaceous Nunavut
Aptian Stage
Fluvial deposits
Paleontology in Nunavut